Puka Salli (Quechua puka red, salli sulfur, red sulfur, also spelled Puca Salle) is a mountain in the Bolivian Andes which reaches a height of approximately . It is located in the Cochabamba Department, Quillacollo Province, Quillacollo Municipality. Puka Salli lies southeast of Awila Wachana Punta and northeast of a lake named Parinani Quta (Aymara for "the lake with flamgingos").

References 

Mountains of Cochabamba Department